Mary O’Malley is a speaker and the author of Belonging to Life: The Journey of Awakening, The Gift of Our Compulsions: a Revolutionary Approach to Self Acceptance and Healing, The Magical Forest of Awakening, and What's In the Way IS the Way. She is a certified counselor in the State of Washington in private practice in Kirkland, Washington. She leads groups, retreats, and classes throughout the United States and in Denmark.

Biography 
Mary O'Malley grew up in Washington State and attended Puget Sound University in Tacoma, Washington.

She was hospitalized in 1968 after a number of suicide attempts. She then spent a number of years studying with Patricia Sun, Stephen Levine, Jack Kornfield and Pema Chodron, Brian Swimme and Adyashanti. Since the early 1980s she has been writing books, speaking to groups, leading retreats and working with people individually.

Her philosophies bear some similarities to those of Stephen Levine, Eckhart Tolle and Byron Katie

References

Further reading
 'The Journey of a Lifetime - Mary O'Malley,' Life Manual for 21st Century Women, 2006, by Svetla Bankova.
 'Unconditioned Consciousness and The Power of Now: a Dialogue Between Eckhart Tolle and Mary O'Malley,' Evergreen Monthly, November, 1999, published by Dragonfly Media.

External links 
 www.maryomalley.com

American self-help writers
American psychotherapists
Living people
1945 births